Dionis Sakalak (born 22 October 1913, date of death unknown) was a Turkish basketball player. He competed in the men's tournament at the 1936 Summer Olympics.

References

1913 births
Year of death missing
Turkish men's basketball players
Olympic basketball players of Turkey
Basketball players at the 1936 Summer Olympics
Place of birth missing